Dikenli is a village in the Kâhta District, Adıyaman Province, Turkey. The village is populated by Kurds of the Kawan tribe and had a population of 122 in 2021.

References 

Villages in Kâhta District
Kurdish settlements in Adıyaman Province